A3 is a national highway in Kazakhstan that runs from Almaty to Oskemen with a total length of .

The route starts in Almaty, where it goes north and passes cities of Kapchagay, Taldyqorgan and settlements of Sarqan, Ayagoz and Qalbatau until it reaches its destination in Oskemen.

History 
In years 2013 to 2016 the Almaty - Kapchagay section was reconstructed.

In 2017 the reconstruction of the Taldyqorgan  - Oskemen section had started and the next year the Almaty - Kapchagay section became a toll road.

References 

Roads in Kazakhstan